Southern Popoloca is an indigenous language of Puebla state, Mexico. There are two principal varieties, sometimes counted as distinct languages:
San Juan Atzingo Popoloca ( Atzingo, San Juan)
Metzontla Popoloca ( Los Reyes Metzontla Popoloca) which are about 75% mutually intelligible.

References

Popolocan languages